Forensic Toolkit, or FTK, is a computer forensics software made by AccessData. It scans a hard drive looking for various information. It can, for example, potentially locate deleted emails and scan a disk for text strings to use them as a password dictionary to crack encryption.

FTK is also associated with a standalone disk imaging program called FTK Imager. This tool saves an image of a hard disk in one file or in segments that may be later on reconstructed. It calculates MD5 and SHA1 hash values and can verify the integrity of the data imaged is consistent with the created forensic image. The forensic image can be saved in several formats, including DD/raw, E01, and AD1.

References

External links 
AccessData Forensic Toolkit

Computer forensics
Digital forensics software